The Castello di Tosinasco is a rural castle near the town of Pieve Emanuele, Province of Milan, region of Lombardy, Italy.

The castle was constructed in the 16th century by the D'Adda family. It served to protect the agricultural production of the region. The castle building has a square layout with four corner towers. The building had underground connections to another building some half-mile away.

By 2015, the castle had become the host of buildings for a private golf course.

References

Buildings and structures in the Province of Milan
Tosinasco